Ford Air Transport Service is a defunct airline based in United States of America. The airline was also registered as Ford Air Freight Lines.

History
Ford in 1925 initiated Ford Air Transport Service - the world's first regularly scheduled commercial cargo airline.

Ford Air Transport Service started with Stout 2-AT Pullman aircraft in 1925. Henry and Edsel Ford had an investment in Stout Engineering that became the Stout Metal Airplane Division of the Ford Motor Company later that year in August. The first 2-AT was built at the Stout factory in Dearborn and called the "Maiden Detroit". The other aircraft in the fleet were also 2-AT's, named "Maiden Dearbon I, II, III and IV". Initially the aircraft were for Ford's company use. The airline's first scheduled commercial flights in America were begun when The "Maiden Detroit" flew 1,000 lbs. of freight between factories in Detroit and Chicago on April 14, 1925. 
Ford Air Transport served routes between Chicago, Detroit and Cleveland. The airline logged over 1000 scheduled flights in its first year.

The aircraft operated out of Ford Airport off of two grass runways with night lighting.

The safety and predicability of the first cargo flights were used to advantage in securing the first airmail contracts under the Kelly Act. The "Madien Detroit" entered Contract Air Mail service on February 15, 1926 with Henry and Edsel Ford loading the first bag of mail. The aircraft flew from Detroit to Cleveland under fighter escort to become the first commercial transport of air mail. L.G. "Larry" Fritz piloted the aircraft with Ford and Stout as passengers for the one-hour-seventeen-minute flight. The routes would be known as CAM-6 (Detroit to Cleveland), and CAM-7 (Detroit to Chicago).

In 1928 Ford sold the airmail routes to Stout who also was operating his own airline with Stout-Ford built aircraft. The last official flight was in 1932.

Most of the 2-AT's eventually were sold to Florida Airways, the forerunner of Eastern Airlines.

Destinations

Detroit, Michigan (Ford Airport (Dearborn))
Chicago, Illinois (Airport)
Cleveland, Ohio (Airport)

Fleet

The Ford Air Transport Service fleet consists of the following aircraft:

Accidents and incidents
On May 18, 1926, a Ford Air Transport 2-AT Maiden Deaborn I was involved in the first fatal accident for a commercial US aircraft in Argo, Illinois. The Contract Air Mail pilot crashed and was killed due to flight into poor weather conditions.
On May 12, 1928, a Ford Air Freight 4-AT-01, NC 1492 crashed on takeoff from Dearborn Michigan killing the only two passengers on board the aircraft.

References

Airlines established in 1925
Airlines disestablished in 1932
American companies established in 1925
American companies disestablished in 1932
American Airlines
Defunct companies based in Detroit
Defunct airlines of the United States